The Yanji-Changchun Expressway, designated as G1221 and commonly abbreviated as Yancheng Expressway is an expressway in Jilin, Northeast China linking the cities of Yanbian and Changchun, Jilin.

Detailed Itinerary

References

Expressways in Liaoning
Chinese national-level expressways